ALe 426/506 TAF (acronym of Treno ad Alta Frequentazione) is an Italian Electric Multiple Unit (EMU) used mainly on commuter regional trains. Concept design has been made by Italian designer Pininfarina.

Two different companies employ them: Trenitalia and Ferrovie Nord Milano (FNM). Some slightly modified version of the EMU have been purchased by Moroccan Railways in 2006.

Description 
Each train is formed by fixed sections of four bi-level pieces: two motorized units (ALe 426/506) and two coaches between them (Le 736).
Two sections can be coupled together, but by now it is not possible on Trenitalia units (on FNM ones is common practice).

The total capacity is of 469 seated and 372 standing passengers.

Specifications 
ALe 426/506 employs asynchronous three-phase traction motors feed by the 3000 V DC catenary.
Motors are mounted on one bogie per motorized unit, for a total of two motorized bogies per section.

Operators

Ferrovie Nord Milano

ONCF 
The ONCF operates a fleet of 24 trains.

References

Electric railcars and multiple units of Italy
Double-decker EMUs
AnsaldoBreda multiple units
Train-related introductions in 1996
3000 V DC multiple units